The University of Birmingham Air Squadron, commonly known as UBAS, is a squadron within the Royal Air Force established on 3 May 1941.  It is based at RAF Cosford, Shropshire, and flies a fleet of six Grob Tutors.  In 2009 the squadron upgraded the aircraft to the Grob Tutor EA which has an advanced avionics suite. The Squadron has three Flights, A, B and C; each with a student Flight Commander who holds the rank of Acting Pilot Officer and a Deputy who holds the rank of Officer Cadet. UBAS is also the parent squadron of 8 Air Experience Flight, who jointly fly UBAS' Tutor fleet.

A Squadron Leader is the Commanding Officer, while UBAS also has several other Qualified Flying Instructors, a Ground Training Instructor, 15 civilian support staff who are contracted from Babcock, plus an adjutant and two civilian admin staff. There are some 70 members from the University of Birmingham, Birmingham City University, Aston University, Coventry University, Warwick University, Keele University, Wolverhampton University Staffordshire University, Worcester University, and Harper Adams University.

Students volunteer to join UBAS at their university's Freshers' Fair and then undergo a selection process.  If successful they are attested and join the Royal Air Force Volunteer Reserve.  All Students are given the rank of Officer Cadet, and are issued with a uniform. UBAS activities include flight, sports, military and leadership training, adventurous training, charity and community work and a vibrant social scene.  The scope of UBAS, like other University Air Squadrons is to let young people experience life in the Royal Air Force and to develop their skills in the fields mentioned.

History

Birmingham University Air Squadron was formed on 3 May 1941 and began its first undergraduate initial officer training course in October 1942. In October 1946 it began flying training at RAF Castle Bromwich on the DH Tiger Moth T Mk 2 aircraft. The Squadron re-equipped with the DHC-1 Chipmunk T10 in July 1950 and was renamed the University of Birmingham Air Squadron (UBAS) on 15 October 1951. In March 1958 UBAS was relocated to RAF Shawbury. The Chipmunks served for 25 years until the SA Bulldog T1's replaced them in June 1975. UBAS moved "temporarily" to RAF Cosford in March 1978, and it has remained based there ever since. The Bulldogs were retired in 2001 and were replaced with the Austrian-built Grob G-115E Tutor aircraft. In November 2009 the Grob 115E's were partly replaced with the higher specification Grob 115 EA.

Commanding officers
 Sqn Ldr Colin Massy - 2021–Present 
 Sqn Ldr Craig Finch 2019 - 2021
 Sqn Ldr Ged Sheppeck 2015–2019
 Sqn Ldr Phil Atkinson 2013 - 2015
 (Acting) Sqn Ldr Ian Grogan 2012 - 2013
 Sqn Ldr Mark Richardson 2009 – 2012
 Sqn Ldr Chris Parkinson 2007 - 2009
 Sqn Ldr Laurie Dunn 2005 - 2007
 Sqn Ldr Ged Sheppeck 2003 - 2005
 Sqn Ldr Andy Baker 2000 - 2003

Flying

All of the cadets have the opportunity to participate in the flying syllabus for the University Air Squadrons.

Successful completion of the Core Syllabus qualifies the student pilot for the award of the Preliminary Flying Badge, or 'Budgie Wings' as they are sometimes called.

Student Leadership Team 
Squadron activities are largely run by students who take on various executive roles within UBAS. The squadron is split in to 3 flights, each commanded by a Flight Commander who holds the rank of Acting Pilot Officer.

The squadron also has a Senior Student who is in overall command of all students, serving as a link between the student body and the staff. The current senior student is Acting Pilot Officer Lucy Pepper.

See also
East of Scotland Universities Air Squadron
Liverpool University Air Squadron
Oxford University Air Squadron
Southampton University Air Squadron
Universities of Glasgow and Strathclyde Air Squadron
University Royal Naval Unit, the Royal Navy equivalent
Officers Training Corps, the British Army equivalent
List of Royal Air Force aircraft squadrons

References

External links

Military units and formations in Warwickshire
Organisations based in Shropshire
Birmingham
Air Squadron